Major General Daniel K. Addo is a former Chief of the Defence Staff of the Ghana Armed Forces. He is a Ghanaian soldier and politician.

Career 
Daniel Addo was once Commander of the Second Infantry Brigade Group (now the Northern Command) of the Ghana army. The headquarters was at Kumasi. He had responsibility for all units in the northern half of Ghana. He became Chief of Army Staff in August 1969. In June 1971, he was appointed Chief of the Defence Staff by the Busia government, a position he still occupied at the time of the coup d'état that replaced it with the National Redemption Council military government. He was relieved of his post after the coup.

Politics
The NRC government appointed Major General Addo as the Commissioner for Agriculture, a positioned he held between 1972 and 1973. He was later replaced with Colonel Frank Bernasko.

Personal problems 
In 1982, Daniel Addo had two of his houses confiscated by the "One Man One House" Investigation Sub-Committee under the auspices of the Provisional National Defence Council military government on the grounds that he had acquired them illegally. This was under military decrees of the previous Armed Forces Revolutionary Council, Ghana military government. He appealed unsuccessfully to the Commission on Human Rights and Administrative Justice in 1994 to have the houses returned to him.

References

Living people
Ghanaian soldiers
Agriculture ministers of Ghana
Year of birth missing (living people)